Transtillaspis irrorata is a species of moth of the family Tortricidae. It is found in Ecuador in Morona-Santiago and Tungurahua provinces.

The wingspan is 14 mm.

References

Moths described in 2003
Transtillaspis
Moths of South America
Taxa named by Józef Razowski